Fabio Mascarello (born 10 September 1983) is an Italian former competitive figure skater. He won the 2003 Merano Cup and two Italian national bronze medals.

Programs

Results
JGP: Junior Grand Prix

References

External links
 

Italian male single skaters
Figure skaters at the 2007 Winter Universiade
1983 births
Living people
Competitors at the 2011 Winter Universiade
Competitors at the 2005 Winter Universiade